Bar Aftab-e Amanallah (also Romanized as Bar Āftāb-e Āmānāllah and Barāftāb-e Āmānollah) is a village in Susan-e Gharbi Rural District, Susan District, Izeh County, Khuzestan Province, Iran. At the 2006 census, its population was 123, in 25 families.

References 

Populated places in Izeh County